Diwphalanx Records is a Japanese rock music record label, which primarily releases Japanese bands.

Artist list
Antiseen
Balzac
Banana Shakes
Bitter Sweet Generation
Blue Beat Players
Boris
Church of Misery
Central
Cool Wise Men
Dead Pan Speakers
Doping Panda
Earth Blow
Eternal Elysium
Fishdog
Forevers
Gas Burner
G.A.T.E.S
Hellbent
Greenmachine
Kojima
Little Masta
Low IQ 01
Oi-Skall Mates
Red Hot Rockin' Hood
Rocky & the Sweden
Rude Bones
Rude Pressures
Sandiest
Saturdaynightz
Scafull King
Shoulder Hopper
Sledgehammer 鐵槌
Smash Your Face
Snail Ramp
Stupid Babies Go Mad
Taisho (大将)
The Sideburns
Tijuana Brooks
Tropical Gorilla
United Skates
Wataru Buster

See also
List of record labels

References

External links
Official Diwphalanx Records site

Japanese record labels
Doom metal record labels
Heavy metal record labels